William Brooks Alexander Jr. (December 23, 1921 - January 19, 2006) was an American attorney, farmer, and politician. He was a member of the Mississippi State Senate from 1960 to 1984, and its president pro tempore from 1976 to 1984.

Biography 
William Brooks Alexander was born on December 23, 1921, in Boyle, Mississippi. He was the son of lawyer and state senator William Brooks Alexander Sr. and Vivien B. Alexander. He attended schools in Boyle for 12 years. He also became an Eagle Scout. He graduated from the University of Mississippi Law School in 1948. He was first elected to the Mississippi State Senate in 1960 after the death of his father, who had been the incumbent. In 1966, while still a state senator, he was a candidate for Congress. In 1976, he became the senate's president pro tempore, and held that position until his last Senate term ended in 1984. He died on January 19, 2006.

References 

1921 births
2006 deaths
People from Bolivar County, Mississippi
Mississippi state senators
Presidents pro tempore of the Mississippi State Senate